Regina Antwi (born 26 November 1995) is a Ghanaian professional footballer, who plays as a defender for 1207 Antalya Spor in the Turkish Women's Football Super League, and the Ghana women's national football team. She represented Ghana at the U17 level at two World Cups in 2010 and 2012. She previously played for Hungarian club Diósgyőri VTK.

Club career 
Antwi started her career with Vodafone Ladies before joining Ghatel Ladies Accra. She later joined Hasaacas Ladies in 2012. She would go on to  become an integral member of the squad and help the club to win the Ghana Women's Premier League on three consecutive occasions and the 2019 Ghana Women's Special Competition.

In 2019, she joined Hungarian side Diósgyőri VTK on a two-year deal. She played for the Női NB I for a season, before moving back to Ghana to rejoin her former club. She returned to Hasaacas ahead of the 2020–21 season which she helped the club in winning the treble, the league, the cup and the inaugural 2021 WAFU Zone B Tournament.

In 2021, Antwi transferred to 1207 Antalya Spor to play in the Turkish Women's Football Super League.

International career

Youth 
Antwi made her youth debut for Ghana at under-17 level in 2010. She went on to feature for Ghana at the 2010 FIFA U-17 Women's World Cup in Trinidad and Tobago.

After gaining experience in the 2010 edition, she was recalled in August 2012, for the 2012 FIFA U-17 Women's World Cup in Azerbaijan. She was one of the key players as the Ghana under-17 team finished in third place by beating Germany in the third place match. At the competition she played in all six games and played 90 minutes in all.

Senior 
Antwi was part of the Ghana team that placed third at the 2016 Africa Women Cup of Nations.

Honours 
Hasaacas Ladies

 Ghana Women's Premier League (GWPL): 2012–13, 2013–14, 2014–15, 2020–21
 Ghana Women's Special Competition: 2019
 Ghana Women's FA Cup: 2021
WAFU Zone B Tournament: 2021
CAF Women's Champions League runner-up: 2021

Ghana U17

 FIFA U-17 Women's World Cup third place: 2012

Ghana

 Africa Women Cup of Nations third place: 2016

References

External links 

 
 
 EuroSport Profile
Diósgyőri VTK Profile

1995 births
Living people
Ghanaian women's footballers
Ghana women's international footballers
Women's association football defenders
Ghanaian expatriate women's footballers
Ghanaian expatriate sportspeople in Hungary
Hasaacas Ladies F.C. players
Diósgyőri VTK players
Ghanaian expatriate sportspeople in Turkey
Expatriate women's footballers in Turkey
1207 Antalya Spor players
Turkish Women's Football Super League players